Draško Nenadić (born 15 February 1990) is a Serbian handball player who plays for RK Crvena zvezda and the Serbian national team.

His brother Petar Nenadić is also a handball player, and was part of the national team.

References

1990 births
Living people
Serbian male handball players
Handball players from Belgrade
Expatriate handball players
Serbian expatriate sportspeople in Denmark
Serbian expatriate sportspeople in Germany
Serbian expatriate sportspeople in Slovenia
Serbian expatriate sportspeople in Spain
Handball-Bundesliga players
RK Crvena zvezda players
BM Granollers players
SG Flensburg-Handewitt players
Füchse Berlin Reinickendorf HBC players